Hayden is a British company which designs hand-wired electric guitar amplifiers.  It is a sister company to Ashdown Engineering, which makes high-quality, hand-wired, vacuum-tube (or valve in Britain) amplifiers in England.

At the end of 2007 it was announced that Dave Green, Matamp's chief engineer, would be joining Hayden full-time as 'Valve Amp Guru'. The new designed by Dave Green range has been launched and comprises the products as listed below, a range of valve pedals is expected early 2011.

Products

Hand wired series
Peacemaker 100 Head (4x EL34) made in UK
Classic Lead 80 Head and Combo (4 x ecc83, 4x EL34)
Cotton Club 7/15 combo ( 3 x ecc83, 2 x EL84)
Cotton Club 15/30 ( 3x ecc83 4xEL84)
Petite 2  combo   ( 1 x ecc83, 1x6V6)
Petite 5  (2xecc83 1x6V6 +1 x EL84 switchable)
Speakeasy 50 Head and Combo 5 x ecc83 2xEL34 + 2x6L6 switchable)
Mofo 30 Head  ( 3x ecc83 4 x EL84)
Mofo 55 head and combo   (4 x ecc83 2 x 6550)
Mofo 100 head   (4 x ecc83, 2x6L6+2 x EL34 )

Manufactured Offshore
Mofo 30 as above but more affordable ( 3x ecc83 4xEL84)
Mofo 15 (3xECC83  2xEL84)
Mofo 40 classic (mofo in a traditional wood cabinet)
HGTA 20 head and combo ( high gain all tube amplifier) (3 x ecc 83, 2 x EL84)
HGTA 40 head and combo ( as above)  (3 x ecc 83 2 x EL34)

Peacemaker series(Now Discontinued)
Peacemaker 40 and 60 watt combos
Peacemaker 60 watt head
Fallen angel 180 watt Head

FA DSP series (Now Discontinued)
FA 100 and 50 watt DSP Combos
FA DSP 100 watt head

Notable Users

Artists who use Hayden Guitar Amplifiers;

Carl Barat - Dirty Pretty Things
Chris Urbanowicz - Editors
Keith Murray - We Are Scientists
Kevin Roentgen - Orson
Henry Dartnall - The Young Knives
Rick McNamara - Embrace
Marcus "Fox" Barker - Disappointments
Simon Neil - Biffy Clyro and Marmaduke Duke
Jesse Hughes and Dave Catching - Eagles Of Death Metal
Jamie Wallace - Velouria

See also
 Ashdown Engineering

External links
 

Guitar amplifier manufacturers
Audio equipment manufacturers of the United Kingdom
Companies based in Northampton